Martin McLaughlin is a Republican member of the Illinois House of Representatives for the 52nd district. The district, located in Lake County, Cook County, Kane County, Illinois, and McHenry County includes all or parts Algonquin, Barrington, Barrington Hills, Carpentersville, Cary, Crystal Lake, East Dundee, Fox River Grove, Hoffman Estates, Inverness, Island Lake, Lake Barrington, Lake in the Hills, North Barrington, Oakwood Hills, Port Barrington, Prairie Grove, South Barrington, Tower Lakes, Trout Valley, and Wauconda.

In 2016, McLaughlin ran for District 26 of the Illinois Senate; he was defeated in the primary by Dan McConchie.

In the 2020 general election, McLaughlin won election to the Illinois House of Representatives.

As of July 3, 2022, Representative McLaughlin is a member of the following Illinois House committees:

 Appropriations - General Service Committee (HAPG)
 Commercial & Property Subcommittee (HJUA-COMM)
 Cybersecurity, Data Analytics, & IT Committee (HCDA)
 Ethics & Elections Committee (SHEE)
 Judiciary - Civil Committee (HJUA)
 Prescription Drug Affordability Committee (HPDA)
 Property Tax Subcommittee (HREF-PRTX)
 Revenue & Finance Committee (HREF)

Electoral history

References

External links
 Official legislative website
 Official campaign website

Year of birth missing (living people)
Place of birth missing (living people)
Republican Party members of the Illinois House of Representatives
Living people